Battle of Bardejov was a battle between the Polish king Władysław II Jagiełło and king Sigismund of Hungary and Croatia, later on crowned as King of Germany, King of Bohemia and Holy Roman Emperor. The battle took place on October 1410 in Bardejov and ended with a Jagiełło victory.

References 

1410 in Europe
Bardejov
Bardejov
15th century in Poland